Abd al-Rahman ibn Abd Allah ibn al-Harith, commonly known as A'sha Hamdan or al-A'sha (d. 701 or 702), was a late 7th-century Kufan poet.

Life
A'sha was born in Kufa. He belonged to the South Arabian tribe of Hamdan. He later shifted to poetry, purportedly after dreaming of being in a room full of 'barley' (which has the dual meaning of 'poetry'). He served in the military campaigns of the Kufans during the governorship of al-Hajjaj ibn Yusuf, though evidently this was not always voluntary. One such campaign in Makran took a heavy toll on his health.

He campaigned under the Kufan commander Ibn al-Ash'ath in Daylam. According to one of his poems, he was taken captive there before gaining the love of a Daylamite woman who helped free him. He became akin to the spokesman of Ibn al-Ash'ath during the mass Iraqi rebellion he led against al-Hajjaj and the Umayyads in general. He was present at the Battle of Dayr al-Jamajim in 701 or 702 where Ibn al-Ash'ash was put to flight and al-A'sha captured by the Umayyad troops. He was brought before al-Hajjaj who condemned him for his critical verses against him and the Umayyads. His attempt to win al-Hajjaj's favor by reciting to him an ode of praise did not sway the governor, who had him executed.

Poetry
The historian G. J. H. van Gelder describes A'sha's poetry as "an interesting mixture of the personal and the political". The Encyclopaedia of Islam calls his poems "reflexes of his adventures and political sentiments". In his poems, he often championed the Yaman (South Arabian) tribal faction to which he belonged, in opposition to the northern Arab faction. His poems would be turned into songs by his fellow Hamdani tribesman, the musician Ahmad al-Nasbi.

Al-Tabari preserved the following fragment of A'sha's poem praising Ibn al-Ash'ath (Abd al-Rahman) and condemning al-Hajjaj:

For a lover who has emerged in Zabulistan,  there have been two liars from Thaqif,  their past liar and a second one.  May my Lord give power to Hamdan over Thaqif  For a day until nighttime, so consoling us for what took place [before].  We betook ourselves to the devilish infidel,  When, in unbelief after belief, he exceeded the bounds,  with the noble lord Abd al-Rahman.  He set forth with a throng of Qahtan, like locusts  While from Ma'add ibn Adnan he brought  A tumultuous and might multitude.  So tell Hajjaj, Satan's friend, [if he can],  Stand steady against Madhhij and Hamdan,  that they will give him to drink from the goblet of poison,  And will send him off to the villages of Ibn Marwan.

References

Bibliography
 
 
 
 

701 deaths
7th-century Arabic poets
Poets from the Umayyad Caliphate
People from Kufa
Banu Hamdan
People executed by the Umayyad Caliphate
Arab rebels